Punctelia jujensis is a species of foliose lichen in the family Parmeliaceae. It is found in Argentina and Brazil.

Taxonomy
The lichen was described as a new species by Argentinian lichenologist Mónica Adler in 1989. The type specimen was collected near the Yala River in Jujuy Province (Argentina), where it was found growing on the bark of a Populus tree on the side of a road. Punctelia jujensis is a member of a group of similar Punctelia species with a black lower surface and lacking soredia, isidia, lobules or lacinules; they are known as the "Punctelia microsticta-group".

Description
Pseudocyphellae are sparse and minute (less than 0.2 mm in diameter), and are evenly distributed on the thallus surface. The lichen does make any vegetative propagules–lobulae, squamules, soredia, nor isidia. The medulla is white, while the thallus underside is chestnut or black. The cortex contains atranorin, while the medulla has gyrophoric acid. The conidia are threadlike (filiform), measuring 9–15 μm. The type specimen did not have apothecia, and so ascospore measurements were not given. They were later determined to be ellipsoid in shape, typically measuring 15–21 by 9–13 μm, with an epispore (outer spore covering) of 1–1.5 μm.

Punctelia jujensis was reported from Brazil in 2010.

References

jujensis
Lichen species
Lichens described in 1989
Lichens of Argentina
Lichens of Brazil